Rub It Better is the third studio album by English new wave band General Public, released on 4 April 1995 by Epic Records.  The band had not recorded together in almost 10 years.

Production
The album was produced by Jerry Harrison, former keyboardist and guitarist for Talking Heads. The group chose to return to the ska and reggae sound of the Beat.

Critical reception
The Los Angeles Times called the album "a tuneful collection that deftly combines an assortment of reggae, rock and dance-pop colors--the trademark of the Beat and the first edition of General Public." The Kingston Whig-Standard wrote that "the closest comparison is to B.A.D. (Big Audio Dynamite), whose leader, Mick Jones, was an honorary member of General Public for its first album and appears here again."

Track listing 
 "It Must Be Tough"  – 5:34 (Dave Wakeling, Michael Railton, Roger Charlery)
 "Rainy Days"  – 4:06 (Charlery, Railton, Horace Panter)
 "Hold It Deep"  – 4:34 (Wakeling, Charlery, Railton, Andy "Stoker" Growcott)
 "Big Bed"  – 4:12 (Norman Jones, Wakeling, Charlery, Railton)
 "Punk"  – 3:05 (Charlery)
 "Friends Again"  – 5:41 (Wakeling, David Ricketts, Railton)
 "It's Weird"  – 5:50 (Charlery, Railton)
 "Never Not Alone"  – 4:21 (Wakeling, Charlery, Railton)
 "Handgun"  – 4:52 (Wakeling, Railton)
 "Blowhard"  – 4:38 (Wakeling, Railton)
 "Warm Love"  – 3:35 (Van Morrison)
 "Rub It Better"  – 5:32 (Charlery, Wakeling, Patrick Murray)

Personnel
General Public
David Wakeling – vocals, guitar
Ranking Roger – vocals, programming
Michael Railton – keyboards, vocals
Norman Jones – percussion, vocals 
Wayne Lothian – bass
Dan Chase – drums

with:

Jerry Harrison – guitars, keyboards, background vocals
Mick Jones – guitars
Chris Spedding – guitars
Alex Weir – guitars
Chris Karn – guitars
Chris Manos – guitars
Marc Antoine Vouilloux – guitars
Saxa – saxophone
Andrew Gayle – saxophone
Tom Fabre – saxophone
David Longoria – trumpet/ trumpet solo "Friends Again"
Greg Smith – trombone
Norton Buffalo – harmonica
Pato Banton – toasting
Arlene Newson – background vocals
Andrea Gaines – background vocals
Sharon Celani – background vocals

References

General Public albums
1995 albums
Epic Records albums
Albums produced by Jerry Harrison